And-Jëf may refer to two different Senagalese political parties:
 And-Jëf/African Party for Democracy and Socialism, an active socialist political party in Senegal
 And-Jëf/Revolutionary Movement for New Democracy, a defunct Marxist-Leninist political party in Senegal